Xinghe North railway station is a railway station of the Zhangjiakou–Hohhot high-speed railway. It is located in Xinghe County, Ulanqab, Inner Mongolia.

References

Railway stations in Inner Mongolia